The Blitz Club is a techno nightclub in the Munich district of Ludwigsvorstadt-Isarvorstadt.

History and description 
The club is located in the former congress hall of the Deutsches Museum, completed in 1935 at the location of Munich's Museumsinsel 1. Until 1985, the building housed Munich's largest concert hall and a planetarium, and later an IMAX cinema. After that, the congress hall stood empty for seven years, until in 2016 the current operators of the Blitz Club asked for a possible use of the building. After months of planning and conversion work, which had to take into account the difficult static conditions on the Museumsinsel island, the club opened on 22 April 2017. The nightclub offers two separate dance floors, two bars, several chill-out areas and a smoking room. In total, the club can accommodate up to 800 guests. The Blitz Club also has a vegetarian restaurant with beer garden, which is run independently of the club.

Sound and club architecture 
The sound architecture is the main feature of the club, and has been discussed repeatedly by music magazines and architecture journals. The rooms were optimized for the acoustic experience together with sound engineers, architects and acousticians. In order to achieve optimal room acoustics, there are hardly any right angles in the club, but specially shaped panels made of beech wood and perforated sheet that were developed according to the specifications of an acoustician. In order to gently scatter the sound waves, a seemingly chaotic honeycomb structure, which was modelled after the swarm behaviour of fish, birds and insects and calculated by a specially developed computer algorithm in a week, is milled into the surfaces of these wall panels. The club uses a custom-made PA system by VOID, which is arranged as a four-point system so that there is a PA tower in each corner around the dance floor, as well as 360-degree tweeters hanging from the ceiling named "Blitz horn" that were specially designed for the club and allow the DJ to create three-dimensional sound effects.

Instead of concentrating the attention on the DJ and placing him on a raised stage, the main floor and the sound system were designed to set the focus on the dance floor and the dancers. All in all, the puristic club design is optimized for the sound and dance experience, while oversized branding is avoided. The visual appearance of the club was designed by British musician Trevor Jackson.

DJs, music and scene 

Head of the musical program is DJ David Muallem, further resident DJs are the Zenker Brothers Skee Mask, Stenny, Sascha Sibler, Julietta, Glaskin and La Staab. Blitz Club has featured appearances by DJs and live acts such as Jeff Mills, Richie Hawtin, Carl Craig, Ben Sims, Seth Troxler, I-F, Miss Kittin, Surgeon, Luke Slater, Laurent Garnier, Nina Kraviz, DJ Hell, Sven Väth, Chris Liebing, Monika Kruse, Ellen Allien, Boys Noize, Marcel Dettmann, Ben Klock, Len Faki, Steve Bug, Modeselektor, Michael Mayer, Roman Flügel and Âme. The Blitz Club was also a venue for the Germany-wide Telekom Electronic Beats Clubnight series. The club also offers a series of events for the gay fetish scene called Cruise.

Entry criteria 
The club has a strict ban on photography and filming to ensure that guests can concentrate fully on dancing. According to the operators, however, the club also wants to be a place of inclusion without a strict door policy. In July 2017, the curfew for the Blitz Club was lifted, so that the club is allowed to be open until the morning since then.

Fire brigade and police operations on the opening day 
The club's opening event on 22 April 2017 made headlines throughout Germany. In the weeks before the opening, extensive coverage by the media had created a hype, which led to a huge rush of people on the Museumsinsel island on the opening day. Instead of the permitted maximum of 800 guests, the club was quickly overcrowded with 1500 people. When the further influx of visitors did not stop and the waiting crowd began to block access roads, emergency exits and escape routes and to press against the tram tracks, the fire brigade arrived and called the police for assistance. In order to defuse the situation, about 30 police officers blocked the Rosenheimer Strasse arterial road, cleared the forecourt and sent hundreds of waiting people home. Numerous guests who were not able to enter the club later criticized the organization of the opening event.

Blitz Restaurant 
In addition to the techno club, Blitz also has a vegetarian restaurant with Mexican-Central American cuisine and a beer garden on an outdoor terrace that is located on the banks of the Isar river. Head of the restaurant is Sandra Forster, who had operated several other gastronomy projects in Munich before. Unlike in the club, there is no photo ban in the restaurant. The restaurant, its interior design and the culinary offer were repeatedly the target of reporting in daily newspapers and gastronomy magazines.

Recognition 
The Blitz Club has been regularly featured in national and international daily newspapers and news magazines, specialist magazines for electronic music and club culture, as well as journals for architecture and sound architecture. In the Resident Advisor ranking the nightclub is rated as one of the most popular clubs in Munich (2nd place, as of October 2019). Mixmag Asia rated the club as one of "10 of the best new clubs on the planet to go raving at" in 2017. In the annual readers' poll of Faze Magazine, the club was voted one of the best of the year 2017 (3rd place), in the reader voting for the year 2019 the club achieved the fourth place. In the annual reader poll of Groove magazine, the club was also voted one of the best in 2017 (4th place).

See also

List of electronic dance music venues

References

External links

 
 
 Electronic Beats feature on the Blitz Club (2017)
 Mixmag interview with David Muallem on the club design (2018)
 Groove feature on the Blitz Club (2017, in German)

Electronic dance music venues
Nightclubs in Munich
Buildings and structures in Munich
Music venues in Munich
Culture in Munich